The 39th Information Operations Squadron is an information operations and cyber Formal Training Unit, part of the 318th Cyberspace Operations Group.

The squadron is located at Hurlburt Field, Florida. Its training facility is a state of the art  facility housing several classrooms, multiple small group mission planning rooms and a 60-person auditorium. All classrooms are equipped with communication and computer systems, including secure video teleconferencing and fiber optic infrastructures to allow real-time war gaming and improved instruction at multiple security levels.

Mission
"Provide initial and advanced information operations and cyber training for the United States Air Force."

History

The 39th Intelligence Squadron was assigned to the 67th Intelligence Group, Nellis Air Force Base, Nevada, until 1 October 1988 when it was relocated to Hurlburt Field, Florida.  The squadron assumed the mission of the discontinued Detachment 1, 67th Intelligence Group and was redesignated the 39th Information Operations Squadron on 1 September 1999, to better reflect its new and expanded mission.

On 1 August 2000 the 39th was reassigned to the 318th Information Operations Group.

Lineage
 36th Communications Security Squadron
 Constituted as the 136th Signal Radio Intelligence Company on 7 February 1942
 Activated 15 February 1942
 Redesignated 136th Signal Radio Intelligence Company, Aviation on 4 October 1943
 Redesignated 136th Radio Security Detachment c. 24 January 1945
 Redesignated 136th Radio Security Squadron on 15 March 1949
 Redesignated 136th Communications Security Squadron on 20 January 1951
 Redesignated 36th Communications Security Squadron on 8 December 1953
 Inactivated on 8 May 1955
 Consolidated with the 6919th Electronic Security Squadron as the 39th Intelligence Squadron on 1 November 1994

 6919th Electronic Security Squadron
 Designated as the 6919th Electronic Security Squadron and activated on 1 October 1986
 Inactivated on 31 May 1991
 Consolidated with the 36th Communications Security Squadron as the 39th Intelligence Squadron on 1 November 1994

 39th Information Operations Squadron
 6919th Electronic Security Squadron consolidated with the 36th Communications Security Squadron as the 39th Intelligence Squadron on 1 November 1994
 Activated on 15 November 1994
 Redesignated 39th Information Operations Squadron on 1 September 1999

Assignments
 Army Air Forces, 15 February 1942
 United States Air Force Security Service, 1 February 1949
 6960th Headquarters Support Group, 1 September 1951
 United States Air Force Security Service, 12 May 1952
 Air Force Communications Security Center, 17 February 1954 – 8 May 1955
 6910th Electronic Security Wing, 1 October 1986
 691st Electronic Security Wing, 15 July 1988 – 31 May 1991
 67th Intelligence Group, 15 November 1994
 Air Force Information Warfare Center, 1 October 1998
 318th Information Operations Group, 1 August 2000 – present

Stations
 Bolling Field, District of Columbia, 15 February 1942
 Fort George G. Meade, Maryland, 1 June 1943
 Reading Army Air Field, Pennsylvania, 15 November 1944
 Mitchel Field, New York, 12 November 1945
 Fort Slocum, New York, 21 November 1947
 Brooks Air Force Base, Texas, 3 April 1949
 Kelly Air Force Base, Texas, 1 August 1953 – 8 May 1955
 Sembach Air Base, Germany, 1 October 1986 – 31 May 1991
 Nellis Air Force Base, Nevada, 15 November 1994
 Hurlburt Field, Florida, 1 October 1998 – present

Courses
The 39th teaches six in-residence courses. The Network Warfare Bridge Course as well as the Cyber Warfare Operations Course; the Information Operations Integration Course, which is required training for airmen assigned to information operations team billets; the Air Force OPSEC Course, which teaches operations security to wing level officers and NCOs; and the Operational Military Deception Course, aimed at operational level planners.  The Instructor Methodology Course, which prepares practitioners how to be instructors, and Instructional Systems Design Course, which teaches instructors how to build curriculum.

The 39th also provides initial qualification training for Air Force cyber weapon systems. The Network Warfare Bridge Course (NWBC) provides foundational network warfare skills to the full range of cyber-related Air Force specialties and prepares non-accession Airmen for initial qualification training.  Upon completion of NWBC, graduates will join cyber specialty graduates from technical training to become initially qualified on a range of Air Force cyber operations crew positions.

The squadron also offers two faculty development courses.  The Instructor Methodology Course (IMC) is a 10-day course awarding 4 semester hours of collegiate credit and provides training to potential formal classroom/lab instructors.  Additionally, the Instructional Systems Design (ISD) course merges the AETC ISD and Objectives and Tests course.  It is an intensive 10-day group activity course that awards 3 semester hours of collegiate credit and satisfies the 3-semester hour requirement for the CCAF ISD Certification.

Network Warfare Bridge Course
The predecessor to the Undergraduate Network Warfare Training (UNWT) the new course also known as NWBC was stood up. This course is to train airmen to become Network Warfare Operations Specialists who actively defend a wide variety of vital Air Force networks. Students are educated in network warfare concepts and operational functions.

Information Operations Integration Course
Also known as IOIC, this course trains students in basics of IO, Air Force and Joint doctrine, concepts of operations, executing organizations, and operational functions of the USAF. Students will receive an initial familiarization of operations within the Air & Space Operations Center, focused on effects-based operations, and the importance of IO integration within operations planning.

Air Force OPSEC Course
Also known as AFOC, this course trains wing-level signature managers in operations security concepts to counter potential observation of force activities. Initial training for wing-level OPSEC Officers and NCOs. This course is focused on operations security concepts to assess installation processes in order to provide commanders with viable options in regards to protection or exploitation of installation signatures.

Operational Military Deception
Also known as OMD, this course trains airmen in Military Deception planning to develop military deception plans as a part of campaign/wartime operations. Most planners serve at MAJCOMs or NAFs. Training for MAJCOM/NAF operational Military Deception Planners in an Air & Space Operations Center environment.

Instructor Methodology Course
Also known as IMC, this course trains enlisted, officer, and civilian instructors on instructional methodology as well as basic Instructional Systems Development (ISD).

Instructional Systems Design Course
This course builds off the fundamentals taught in the Instructor Methods Course.  Students work in an interactive group environment to work through the "ADDIE" (Analysis, Design, Development, Implementation, and Evaluation) phases of the ISD model.

See also
Hurlburt Field
67 Cyberspace Wing
16 Air Force
Air Combat Command
 List of cyber warfare forces

References

Bibliography

External links
 Official USAF website
 Official USAF Recruiting site
 DoSomethingAmazing.com
 Air Force BlueTube
  Searchable database of Air Force historical reports
 USAF emblems

39
Military units and formations in Florida